Thomas Didillon (born 28 November 1995) is a French professional footballer who plays as a goalkeeper for Ligue 1 side Monaco, on loan from Cercle Brugge.

Club career

Metz
Didillon is a youth exponent from Metz who signed with the first team in 2013. He made his Ligue 2 debut in Metz's champion season on 16 May 2014 against Stade Lavallois in a 0–0 away draw.

After spending a year on loan to RFC Seraing, Didillon returned to Metz for the 2015–16 Ligue 2 season and helped the club re-gain promotion to Ligue 1.

On 13 August 2016, Didillon made his Ligue 1 debut in a 3–2 victory against Lille. It was the club's first first division win since securing promotion. The following season; Didillon lost his role as starting goalkeeper to Japanese national team player, Eiji Kawashima.

Seraing (loan)
During the 2014–15 season, he played 31 competitive games on loan for Belgian second division side RFC Seraing, where he had moved alongside fellow Metz-players Saliu Popoola and Samy Kehli.

Anderlecht
After ten years with Metz, Didillon signed with Belgian champions, Anderlecht of the Belgian Jupiler Pro League in June 2018. On 20 September, he made his UEFA Europa League debut in a 1–0 loss against Slovakian club, Spartak Trnava.

Didillon quickly established himself as the starter in the Anderlecht goal: in his first season he did not miss a single league match and was only replaced by backup Frank Boeckx in the cup match against Union Saint-Gilloise and the final Europa League group match against Dinamo Zagreb. Didillon was praised in the regular competition for his strong reflexes and leadership, and was even called a bright spot in an otherwise meagre season for Anderlecht. However, in the first two days of the play-offs he made mistakes against Genk and Club Brugge after bad footwork, which changed the perception around him.

During the 2019–20 pre-season, Didillon made mistakes on return balls in the friendlies against Ajax and AZ. Because manager Vincent Kompany's system required a sweeper keeper and Didillon's footwork was not considered good enough for that, Anderlecht started looking for a new goalkeeper in the summer of 2019. On the opening day against Oostende he was the starter in goal, but he was since replaced by Hendrik Van Crombrugge. From the second matchday, Didillon alternated between the bench and reserves.

Genk (loan)
In January 2020, Didillon was loaned by league rivals Genk until the end of the season with an option to purchase. Genk had a shortage of available goalkeepers at that time. At the end of the season, the purchase option was not used and Didillon returned to Anderlecht.

Cercle Brugge
In August 2020, Didillon signed a four-year contract with Cercle Brugge.

Monaco (loan)
On 20 July 2022, Didillion joined Monaco on a season-long loan.

International career
Didillon has represented France at the U16 through U21 levels. In 2015, Didillon participated in the Toulon Tournament, leading France to a victory over Morocco in the final.

Career statistics

Honours
Metz
 Ligue 2: 2013–14

References

External links
 
 

1995 births
Living people
Association football goalkeepers
French footballers
France youth international footballers
France under-21 international footballers
FC Metz players
R.F.C. Seraing (1922) players
R.S.C. Anderlecht players
K.R.C. Genk players
Cercle Brugge K.S.V. players
AS Monaco FC players
Ligue 1 players
Ligue 2 players
Belgian Pro League players
Challenger Pro League players
French expatriate footballers
French expatriate sportspeople in Belgium
Expatriate footballers in Belgium